Shamil Radzhabovich Gamzatov (born August 9, 1990 in Dagestan) is a Russian  mixed martial artist competing in the Light Heavyweight division. A professional since 2012, he has competed in the  Ultimate Fighting Championship (UFC), World Series of Fighting, Absolute Championship Berkut and competed in the Middleweight division  of the Professional Fighters League.

Background
He was born in Kizlyar city, Dagestan, Soviet Union into a devout Sunni muslim family of Avar origin from Tsurib village, Charodinsky District. He started training in freestyle wrestling at 8 years of age, after an injured knee he retired. At 15 years of age he joined Amateur MMA under Zalimkhan Tatev. He won European and World MMA titles in amateur level. Also he is a Dagestan national kickboxing champion, 3x grappling Abdu-Dabi tournament winner. Combat Sambo North Caucasian championships 3rd 2015 at 100 kg.  At the World Grappling Championships (World Grappling Association) he won the gold medal at 92 kilos.

Gamzatov said of his changing of sports as a kid, “[I] changed various sports and performed in them: combat sambo, grappling, amateur MMA. Then there was a transition to MMA and there was a debut and so began my career as a professional!”

Mixed martial arts career

World Series of Fighting

He made his debut in the USA on January 23, 2016 at WSOF 27, his opponent was Teddy Holder of Tennessee. He won the fight by TKO (punches) in the first round.

Absolute Championship Berkut

He faced Rodney Wallace on January 13, 2017 at ACB 51. He won the back-and-forth fight by split decision.

Professional Fighters League

Gamzatov faced Eddie Gordon on July 5, 2018 at PFL 3. He won the fight by unanimous decision.

In his next bout, Gamzatov faced Rex Harris on 16 August 2018 at PFL 6. He won the fight by unanimous decision.

Ultimate Fighting Championship
Gamzatov signed a four-fight deal with the UFC in July.

Gamzatov made his promotional debut against Klidson Abreu on November 9, 2019 at UFC Fight Night 163. He won the fight via split decision.

Gamzatov was scheduled to face Ovince Saint Preux on April 25, 2020.  However, Gamzatov was forced to pull from the event due to COVID-19 pandemic travel restriction  The match was rescheduled on August 22, 2020 at UFC on ESPN 15. However, for unknown reason, Gamzatov was pulled from the bout and he was replaced by Alonzo Menifield.

Gamzatov was briefly linked to a bout against  Devin Clark  on November 28, 2020 at UFC on ESPN: Blaydes vs. Lewis. However, Gamzatov was removed from the bout in mid-October due to alleged visa issues and was replaced by Anthony Smith on the card.

Gamzatov was scheduled to face Da Un Jung on April 10, 2021 at UFC on ABC 2. However, Gamzatov was removed from the bout on March 24 due to alleged visa issues and replaced by William Knight.

Gamzatov faced Michał Oleksiejczuk on October 30, 2021 at UFC 267. He lost the bout via TKO in the first round, losing for the first time in his professional career.

Gamzatov was scheduled to face Misha Cirkunov on August 6, 2022 at UFC on ESPN: Santos vs. Hill. However, Gamzatov was unable to obtain a US visa and the bout was scrapped, after which he and the UFC parted ways.

Championships and accomplishments

Grappling
Abu Dhabi grappling tournament
3x tournament winner.
World Grappling Association
World champion (92 kg).

MMA
World Mixed Martial Arts Amateur Union
European champion 2013 (93 kg).
World champion 2013 (93 kg).

Mixed martial arts record

|-
|Loss
|align=center| 14–1
|Michał Oleksiejczuk
|TKO (punches)
|UFC 267 
|
|align=center|1
|align=center|3:31
|Abu Dhabi, United Arab Emirates
|  
|-
|Win
|align=center| 14–0
|Klidson Abreu
|Decision (split)
|UFC Fight Night: Magomedsharipov vs. Kattar 
|
|align=center|3
|align=center|5:00
|Moscow, Russia
|
|-
|Win
|align=center| 13–0
|Rex Harris
|Decision (unanimous)
|PFL 6 
|
|align=center|3
|align=center|5:00
|Atlantic City, New Jersey, United States
|
|-
|Win
|align=center| 12–0
|Eddie Gordon 
|Decision (unanimous)
|PFL 3 
|
|align=center|3
|align=center|5:00
|Washington, D.C., United States
|
|-
| Win
| align=center| 11–0
| Rodney Wallace 
| Decision (split)
| ACB 51
| 
| align=center| 3
| align=center| 5:00
| Irvine, California, United States
|
|-
| Win
| align=center| 10–0
| Teddy Holder
| TKO (punches)
| WSOF 27
| 
| align=center| 1
| align=center| 2:32
| Memphis, Tennessee, United States
| 
|-
| Win
| align=center| 9–0
| Yuri Gorbenko
| Submission (triangle choke)
| N1 Pro: Nomad Pro MMA Cup 2014
| 
| align=center| 1
| align=center| 3:39
| Grozny, Russia
| 
|-
| Win
| align=center| 8–0
| Sukhrob Muradov
| TKO (punches)
| Fight Star: Saransk vs. Penza
| 
| align=center| 1
| align=center| 1:16
| Saransk, Russia
| 
|-
| Win
| align=center| 7–0
| Vladimir Mishchenko
| Submission (guillotine choke)
| Warriors Honor: Mayor's Cup
| 
| align=center| 2
| align=center| 2:07
| Kharkov, Ukraine
| 
|-
| Win
| align=center| 6–0
| Andrey Musanipov
| Submission (armbar)
| Battle of Champions 2
| 
| align=center| 2
| align=center| 1:14
| Ufa, Russia
| 
|-
| Win
| align=center| 5–0
| Ivan Fedunov	
| KO (punch)
| Versia Fighting Championship 1
| 
| align=center| 1
| align=center| 3:52
| Pyatigorsk, Russia
|
|-
| Win
| align=center| 4–0
| Ilya Gunenko
| Submission (armbar)
| WCSA Combat League: Combat Ring 3
| 
| align=center| 1
| align=center| 2:14
| Odessa, Ukraine
|
|-
| Win
| align=center| 3–0
| Rustam Omar-Ogly
| Submission (armbar)
| Derbent Fighting Championship
| 
| align=center| 1
| align=center| 3:40
| Derbent, Russia
| 
|-
| Win
| align=center| 2–0
| Assaad Raad
| TKO (punches) 
| Top Fight: Battle of the Gyms
| 
| align=center| 2
| align=center| 2:35
| Dubai, United Arab Emirates
| 
|-
| Win
| align=center| 1–0
| Murat Aibazov
| TKO (punches) 
| FoPoKC: Cup of Friendship
| 
| align=center| 2
| align=center| 1:35
| Teberda, Russia
|
|-

See also
 List of male mixed martial artists

References

External links
 
 

1990 births
Living people
Russian male mixed martial artists
Dagestani mixed martial artists
Avar people
Sportspeople from Makhachkala
Russian Muslims
Russian expatriates in the United States
Russian sambo practitioners
Russian male kickboxers
Russian practitioners of Brazilian jiu-jitsu
Middleweight mixed martial artists
Mixed martial artists utilizing sambo
Mixed martial artists utilizing kickboxing
Mixed martial artists utilizing Brazilian jiu-jitsu